José Luis López Panizo (6 February 1922 – 14 February 1990) was a Spanish footballer who played as an attacking midfielder.

During 16 seasons he played for Athletic Bilbao, appearing in 413 official matches (179 goals) and winning seven major titles.

Club career
Born in Sestao, Biscay, Panizo arrived at Athletic Bilbao's youth system at the age of 16 from Basque neighbours Sestao Sport Club, being almost immediately promoted to the first team. During 16 professional seasons he would play in 326 La Liga matches, scoring 136 goals (seven years in double digits); in the 1942–43 campaign, as Athletic won the double, he netted 12 in 24 games.

At the age of 33, Panizo moved to another Basque club, modest SD Indautxu, closing out his career after one year. He died eight days after his 68th birthday, in Portugalete.

International career
Panizo made his debut for Spain on 23 June 1946, in a 0–1 friendly loss to the Republic of Ireland in Madrid. In the following seven years he earned a further 13 caps, scoring twice.

Panizo was selected for the squad present at the 1950 FIFA World Cup, appearing four times as the nation reached the second group stage of the competition.

Honours
La Liga: 1942–43  
Copa del Generalísimo: 1943, 1944, 1944–45, 1949–50
Copa Eva Duarte: 1950

External links

1922 births
1990 deaths
Spanish footballers
Footballers from the Basque Country (autonomous community)
Association football midfielders
La Liga players
Segunda División players
Sestao Sport Club footballers
Athletic Bilbao footballers
SD Indautxu footballers
Spain international footballers
1950 FIFA World Cup players
Sportspeople from Biscay
People from Sestao